Mazagway (Musgoy; also known as Mazagway-Hidi) is a Chadic language spoken in Cameroon, in North Province and Far North Province. Blench (2006) classifies it as a dialect of Daba.

Mazagway or Mazagway Hidi is spoken in the Mousgoy region in the northern part of Guider commune (Mayo-Louti department, North Region) and in the south of the commune of Hina (Mayo-Tsanaga, Far North Region). It is closely related to Daba, which was formerly considered to be a dialect of Mazagway.

Notes 

Biu-Mandara languages
Languages of Cameroon